Thomas James Calvert (6 September 1917 – 22 January 1981) was an Australian rules footballer who played with St Kilda in the Victorian Football League (VFL).

Notes

External links 

1917 births
1981 deaths
Australian rules footballers from Victoria (Australia)
St Kilda Football Club players